Pascal Stenzel (born 20 March 1996) is a German professional footballer who plays as a right-back for Bundesliga club VfB Stuttgart.

Club career

Borussia Dortmund
Stenzel is a Borussia Dortmund youth exponent, who played for the reserve team. He made his professional debut in the 3. Liga at 2 August 2014 against Holstein Kiel.

SC Freiburg
On 29 January 2016, Stenzel joined SC Freiburg on a loan until 30 June 2017. In April, he signed permanently with Freiburg, agreeing to a contract reportedly running until 2021.

VfB Stuttgart
For the 2019–20 season Stenzel was loaned out to VfB Stuttgart. On 1 July 2020, Stenzel moved permanently to Stuttgart and signed a contract until June 2024.

Career statistics

References

External links

1996 births
Living people
German footballers
Borussia Dortmund players
Borussia Dortmund II players
SC Freiburg players
VfB Stuttgart players
Association football midfielders
Bundesliga players
2. Bundesliga players
3. Liga players
Regionalliga players
Germany youth international footballers
Germany under-21 international footballers
Footballers from North Rhine-Westphalia
People from Herford (district)
Sportspeople from Detmold (region)